Dynamic Man was a name shared by two Golden Age superheroes:

Dynamic Man (Timely Comics)
Dynamic Man (Dynamic Publications)